The following is the list of laws passed by the 13th Congress of the Philippines:

References 

 

+13th Congress
Philippines politics-related lists
Presidency of Gloria Macapagal Arroyo
History of the Congress of the Philippines